Dino Polska S.A. is a Polish retail company that operates grocery stores throughout Poland. The retail chain was founded in 1999 by Tomasz Biernacki. Dino supermarkets are generally located in medium and small-sized towns as well as on the peripheries of larger cities. The retailer started out in western Poland, but has since expanded across the entire country. As of 2017, Dino supermarkets are located in the following voivodeships: Greater Poland, Kuyavian-Pomeranian, Lesser Poland, Lower Silesian, Lubusz, Łódź, Opole, Pomeranian, Silesian, Świętokrzyskie as well as in the West Pomeranian Voivodeship. 

Structure

The Dino Polska logistics network is based on three distribution centres located in: Krotoszyn, Jastrowie, Piotrków Trybunalski and Rzeszotory. Due to the expansion of the retail chain, Tomasz Biernacki set up the private limited company Dino Polska Sp. z o.o., whom over the course of the next three years sold all Dino stores to. The continued expansion of the company forced its transformation into a joint-stock company.

Dino Polska stores offer their customers around five-thousand different articles, with each store including a meat counter, selling meat, prosciutto and a variety of prepared meat types mainly supplied by Agro-Rydzyna. Dino Polska is the owner of the Agro-Rydzyna meat plant. Since 2010, Dino Polska is sole distributor of meat and ham products under this brand, buying shares in the company since 2003.

In June 2010, Enterprise Investors, an investment fund, bought 49% of the shares in the company for 200 million zlotys. Since its relations with Enterprise Investors, the retail chain began to markedly expand, from 111 stores at the end of 2010 to 628 stores by the end of December 2016. In April 2017, Enterprise Investors allocated all of its assets onto the Warsaw Stock Exchange. There are 1056 stores as of June 2019.

References

Dino
Dino
Dino
Dino
Dino
1999 establishments in Poland